The 1928 United States presidential election in South Dakota took place on November 6, 1928, as part of the 1928 United States presidential election which was held throughout all contemporary 48 states. Voters chose five representatives, or electors to the Electoral College, who voted for president and vice president.

Ever since statehood South Dakota had been solidly Republican apart from when supporting Populist-backed William Jennings Bryan by an exceedingly narrow 0.22% margin in 1896. However, the state had been one of the strongest for insurgent Robert M. La Follette senior in 1924, and after La Follette died six months following that election his family would endorse New York City Catholic Democrat Al Smith rather than any Republican.

In the more Catholic states of North Dakota and Wisconsin, this endorsement would have a major effect in reviving a largely moribund Democratic Party at a presidential level, although it was not adequate to give Smith those states’ electoral votes. In less Catholic and more Ozark-settled and Methodist South Dakota, anti-Catholicism was a powerful force in most areas and as a result Smith’s gain on Davis’ vote was much less, with the exception of a few powerfully pro-La Follette German Lutheran counties whose voters were lured by Smith’s opposition to Prohibition. Armstrong County, a sparsely-populated part of an Indian reservation, cast all 7 of its votes for Smith, setting a record for the nation. Smith was the first ever Democrat to win McPherson County, but South Dakota still voted for Republican nominee Herbert Hoover by a margin of 20.98%, which made it 3.56% more Republican than the nation at-large in a major landslide.

Results

Results by county

See also
 United States presidential elections in South Dakota

References

South Dakota
1928
1928 South Dakota elections